Islampur Assembly constituency may refer to 

 Islampur, Bihar Assembly constituency
 Islampur, Maharashtra Assembly constituency
 Islampur, West Bengal Assembly constituency